Brazil sent a delegation to compete at the 2008 Summer Paralympics in Beijing, China The country debuted in the Games in 1972 and 2008 was its 10th participation.

Brazil also sent the largest number of athletes to the Paralympics in its history, with 188 athletes competing in 17 Paralympic sports. Brazil didn't include any competitors in the archery and wheelchair rugby. In the Opening Ceremony, the Brazilian Flag bearer was the judoka Antônio Tenório Silva, who became four-time Paralympic champion in his category.

In 2008, Brazil had its second strongest showing in the history of the Games, finishing in respectable 9th place. André Brasil and Daniel Dias, both of swimming and Lucas Prado of athletics were Brazil's top medalists. Prado won three gold medals, Brasil won five medals (four golds and one silver) and Dias won nine medals (four golds, four silvers and one bronze).

Medalists

Sports

Athletics

Men's track

Men's field

Women's track

Women's field

Boccia

Cycling

Men's road

Men's track

Equestrian

Individual events

Team

* - denotes highest scores counted towards total score.

Football 5-a-side

The Brazilian football 5-a-side team won the gold medal after defeating China in the gold medal match.

Players
Ricardo Alves
Andreonni Farias Rego
Marcos Felipe
Jefferson Gonçalves
Mizael Oliveira
Damião Ramos
Fábio Ribeiro Vasconcelos
João Batista Silva
Severino Silva
Sandro Soares

Tournament

Gold medal match

Football 7-a-side

The Brazilian football 7-a-side team didn't win any medals; they were defeated by Iran in the bronze medal match.

Players
Fabiano Bruzzi
Adriano Costa
Irineu Ferreira
Marcos Ferreira
José Guimarães
Leandro Marinho
Gilberto Moraes
Wanderson Oliveira
Antônio Rocha
Luciano Rocha
Jean Rodrigues
Marcos Silva

Tournament

Semi final

Bronze medal match

Goalball

Men's tournament
The men's team didn't win any medals; they were 11th out of 12 teams.
Players
Alexsander Celente
Thiago Henrique Firmino da Costa
Legy Freire
Paulo Homem
Romário Marques
Luiz Silva Filho

Results

11/12th classification

Women's tournament
The women's team didn't win any medals; they were 6th out of 8 teams.
Players
Adriana Bonifácio Lino
Ana Carolina Duarte Ruas Custódio
Cláudia Paula Gonçalves de Amorim Oliveira
Simone Rocha
Neuzimar Santos
Luana Silva

Results

Judo

Men

Women

Powerlifting

Men

Women

Rowing

Shooting

Men

Swimming

Men

Women

Table tennis

Men

Women

Teams

Volleyball

The men's volleyball team didn't win any medals, they were 6th out of 8 teams.

Players
Wellington Anunciação
Samuel Arantes
Giovani Freitas
Guilherme Gomes
Renato Leite
Rodrigo Mello
Wescley Oliveira
Diogo Rebolcas
Deivisson Santos
Cláudio Silva
Daniel Silva
Gilberto Silva

Tournament

5th-8th Classification Semifinals

5th/6th Classification

Wheelchair basketball

Men's tournament
The men's team didn't win any medals; they were 9th out of 12 teams.
Players
Sérgio Alexandre
Everaldo Lima
Leandro Mirando
Irio Nunes
Nilton Pessoa
Heriberto Rocha
Douglas Silva
Erick Silva
José Marcos Silva
José Ricardo Silva
Gelson Silva Jr
Francisco Silva Sandoval

Results

 

 

 
Classification round semifinals

 
Ninth place classification

Women's tournament
The women's team didn't win any medals; they were 10th out of 10 teams.
Players
Vileide Almeida
Mônica Andrade Santos
Débora Costa
Andreia Cristina Farias
Helena Ferrão
Elizabeth Gomes
Naildes Mafra
Jucilene Moraes
Ozineide Pantoja
Cleonete Reis
Rosália Silva Ramos
Lia Soares Martins

Results

 

9-10th classification

Wheelchair tennis

Men

See also
2008 Summer Paralympics
Brazil at the Paralympics
Brazil at the 2008 Summer Olympics

External links
Beijing 2008 Paralympic Games Official Site
International Paralympic Committee

References

Nations at the 2008 Summer Paralympics
2008
Paralympics